The 2021–22 West Coast Conference men's basketball season will begin with practices in September 2021 and will end with the 2022 West Coast Conference men's basketball tournament in March 2022. This will be the 71st season for WCC men's basketball, and the 33nd under its current name of "West Coast Conference". The conference was founded in 1952 as the California Basketball Association, became the West Coast Athletic Conference in 1956, and dropped the word "Athletic" in 1989.

Head coaches

Coaching changes 
Two new head coaches will lead their team in the WCC during the 2021-22 season. On March 22, 2021, Shantay Legans, the then coach at Eastern Washington University, revealed via Twitter that he had accepted the position as the head coach at the University of Portland. Then, on July 7, 2021, the University of the Pacific announced that associate head coach Leonard Perry would become the new head coach of the Tigers. The former head coach, Damon Stoudamire, accepted a position as an assistant coach with the Boston Celtics under Ime Udoka. Perry was previously the head basketball coach at the University of Idaho from 2001–2006.

Coaches

Notes:

 Year at school includes 2021–22 season.
 Overall and WCC records are from time at current school and are through the beginning of the 2021–22 season.

Preseason

Conference realignment 
On September 10, 2021, BYU was one of four schools (the others being Cincinnati, Houston, and UCF) that accepted invitations to join the Big 12 Conference beginning with the 2023-24 athletic season. Therefore, BYU will remain a member of the WCC for the current season and the 2022–23 season, with the WCC potentially dropping to 9 teams for the 2023-24 season. West Coast Conference commissioner Gloria Nevarez indicated that the conference is open to adding additional schools to the conference to ensure "continued success" for the league.

Preseason poll

All-WCC Preseason Men's Basketball team

Rankings

Regular season

Conference matrix

Early season tournaments 
The following table summarizes the multiple-team events (MTE) or early season tournaments in which teams from the West Coast Conference will participate.

WCC Player/Freshman of the Week 
Throughout the year, the West Coast Conference names a player of the week and a freshman of the week as follows:

National Awards and Teams

All-Americans 

The following WCC players were named as national All-Americans as follows:

Other National Awards 
The following WCC players were named to national award watch lists and received awards as follows:

Wooden Award - Player of the Year

Naismith Award - Player of the Year

Lute Olson - Player of the Year

Bob Cousy Award - Point Guard

Jerry West Award - Shooting Guard

Julius Erving Award - Small Forward

Karl Malone Award - Power Forward

Kareem Abdul-Jabbar Award - Center

All-WCC Awards and Teams 
On March 2, 2022, the West Coast Conference announced the following awards:

Postseason

West Coast Conference tournament 
Gonzaga defeated Saint Mary's 82–69 in the Championship game to win the tournament on March 8. Mark Few was the winning coach and Andrew Nembhard was named the MVP of the tournament.

NCAA tournament 
Three teams from the WCC participated in the 2022 NCAA Tournament. Gonzaga received the automatic bid from the WCC and the #1 overall seed. Gonzaga advanced to the Sweet 16, where they were defeated by Arkansas 74–68. Saint Mary's received a 5 seed as an at-large selection and advanced to the second round where they were defeated by UCLA 72–56. San Francisco received a 10 seed as an at-large selection but was defeated in overtime in the first round 92–87 by Murray State.

National Invitation Tournament (NIT) 
BYU and Santa Clara participated in the 2022 NIT. BYU received a 2 seed and advanced to the Quarterfinals where they lost to Washington State 77–58 while Santa Clara lost in the first round to Washington State 63–50.

College Basketball Invitational (CBI) tournament 
No teams from the WCC participated in the 2022 CBI Tournament.

The Basketball Classic (TBC) 
Portland received an invitation to and participated in the 2022 TBC. Portland defeated New Orleans in the first round but lost to Southern Utah in the quarterfinals 77–66.

References 

West Coast Conference men's basketball tournament